Joseph Weider (November 29, 1919 – March 23, 2013) was a Canadian bodybuilder and entrepreneur who co-founded the International Federation of BodyBuilders (IFBB) alongside his brother Ben Weider. He was also the creator of Mr. Olympia, Ms. Olympia, and the Masters Olympia bodybuilding contests.  He was the publisher of various bodybuilding and fitness-related magazines, most notably Muscle & Fitness, Flex, Men's Fitness, and Shape, and the manufacturer of a line of fitness equipment and fitness supplements.

Life and career

Weider was born in Montreal, Quebec, Canada, to Louis and Anna Weider, Polish Jewish emigrants from Kurów, Poland. He published the first issue of Your Physique magazine in 1940, and built a set of barbells out of car wheels and axles the same year out of the family garage on Coloniale Street in Montreal. He designed numerous training courses beginning in the 1950s, including the Weider System of Bodybuilding.

He married Hedwiges "Vicky" Uzar; together they had one child, Lydia Ross, and subsequently divorced in 1960. During his marriage to Vicky Uzar, he had met Betty Brosmer, who was then the highest-paid pin-up girl in the U.S. In 1961 Joe and Betty married, and she began working alongside him as Betty Weider. Betty and Joe together authored books on bodybuilding. Joe and Ben together were the co-founders of the International Federation of BodyBuilders.

In 1968, the brothers brought Arnold Schwarzenegger to California. At the time Schwarzenegger was a relatively unknown Austrian bodybuilder.

Nutritional products
The family founded Weider Nutrition in 1936, considered the first sports nutrition company. Now called Schiff Nutrition International, they were the creators of Tiger's Milk nutrition bars and related products, one of the earliest lines of sports foods.

Fitness publications
In 1953, Your Physique was renamed Muscle Builder magazine. The name changed again to Muscle & Fitness in 1980. Other magazines published by Weider's publishing empire included Mr. America, Muscle Power, Shape magazine, Fit Pregnancy, Men's Fitness, Living Fit, Prime Health and Fitness, Cooks, Senior Golfer, and Flex, in addition to the "skin magazines" Jem Magazine and Monsieur. The last two publications caused at least two clashes with obscenity laws. Weider has written numerous books, including The Weider System of Bodybuilding (1981), and co-wrote the 2006 biography Brothers Of Iron with Ben Weider. In 1983, Weider was named "Publisher of the Year" by The Periodical and Book Association. In 2003, his publication company, Weider Publications, was sold to American Media.

Legal issues
In 1972, Weider and his brother Ben found themselves the target of an investigation led by U.S. Postal inspectors. The investigation involved the claims regarding their nutritional supplement Weider Formula No. 7. The product was a weight-gainer that featured a young Arnold Schwarzenegger on the label. The actual claim centered on consumers being able to "gain a pound per day" in mass. Following an appeal wherein Schwarzenegger testified, Weider was forced to alter his marketing and claims. Also in 1972, Weider encountered legal problems for claims made in his booklet Be a Destructive Self-Defense Fighter in Just 12 Short Lessons.

Weider was ordered to offer a refund to 100,000 customers of a "five-minute body shaper" that was claimed to offer significant weight loss after just minutes a day of use. The claims, along with misleading "before and after" photographs, were deemed false advertising by a Superior Court Judge in 1976.

In the 1980s, Weider found himself answering charges levied by the Federal Trade Commission (FTC). In 1984, the FTC charged that ads for Weider's Anabolic Mega-Pak (containing amino acids, minerals, vitamins, and herbs) and Dynamic Life Essence (an amino acid product) had been misleading. The FTC complaint was settled in 1985 when Weider and his company agreed not to falsely claim that the products could help build muscles or be effective substitutes for anabolic steroids. They also agreed to pay a minimum of $400,000 in refunds or, if refunds did not reach this figure, to fund research on the relationship of nutrition to muscle development.

In 2000, Weider Nutritional International settled another FTC complaint involving false claims made for alleged weight loss products. The settlement agreement called for $400,000 to be paid to the FTC and for a ban on making any unsubstantiated claims for any food, drug, dietary supplement, or program.

Death
Weider died of heart failure on March 23, 2013, at Cedars-Sinai Medical Center in Los Angeles, at the age of 93.

Honours and accolades

On Labor Day 2006, California governor and seven times Mr. Olympia winner Arnold Schwarzenegger, a Weider protégé, presented him with the Venice Muscle Beach Hall of Fame's Lifetime Achievement award. Schwarzenegger credited Weider with inspiring him to enter bodybuilding and to come to the United States. That same year Joe and Ben received the lifetime achievement award by the Young Men's Hebrew Association.

In popular culture
The movie Bigger was released in 2018 focusing on the life of Joe Weider. Tyler Hoechlin plays Joe Weider, while Julianne Hough plays Betty Weider, his second wife. Aneurin Barnard plays the role of Ben Weider, Joe's younger brother.

Bibliography

References

Further reading

See also
 Jake Wood (bodybuilding)

External links

Joe Weider Official Website

1919 births
2013 deaths
Anglophone Quebec people
Canadian bodybuilders
Canadian expatriate sportspeople in the United States
Canadian sports coaches
Canadian sports businesspeople
Canadian people of Polish-Jewish descent
Canadian magazine publishers (people)
Sportspeople from Montreal
Businesspeople from Montreal
Bodybuilding
People associated with physical culture